Azure is a media brand covering architecture and design published in Toronto, Ontario, Canada.  Azure is described as "an indispensable resource for architects, designers and the design-savvy public" on its website. It was founded in 1985 by Nelda Rodger and Sergio Sgaramella. In 2000, it won the Canadian National Magazine Awards' Magazine of the Year. In 2011, the magazine launched the AZ Awards, an international competition open to architects, landscape architects, designers, students, clients, and manufacturers. In February 2013, deputy editor Catherine Osborne was named the magazine's editor-in-chief, with founding editor Nelda Rodger remaining as editorial director for Azure Publishing. In February 2021 Elizabeth Pagliacolo was named editor-in-chief, and in January 2022 Francesco Sgaramella became Azure's chief operating officer.

References

External links 
 Official Website

Architecture magazines
Bi-monthly magazines published in Canada
Lifestyle magazines published in Canada
Visual arts magazines published in Canada
Design magazines
Magazines established in 1985
Magazines published in Toronto